Longitarsus ibericus is a species of beetle in the subfamily Galerucinae that is endemic to Spain.

References

I
Beetles described in 1974
Endemic fauna of Spain
Beetles of Europe